Bong is a surname in various cultures.

Origins
Bong may be a spelling of a number of Chinese surnames based on their pronunciation in different varieties of Chinese. They are listed below by their Mandarin Pinyin spelling:
 Huáng (meaning "yellow"); spelled Bong based on the Hakka pronunciation in dialects spoken in parts of Indonesia and Malaysia
 Wáng (meaning "king");  spelled Bong based on the Hakka pronunciation in dialects spoken in parts of Indonesia and Malaysia
 ; spelled Bong based on the Hokkien pronunciation

Bong is the Revised Romanization spelling of a Korean surname originally written using either of two hanja. These surnames are also spelled Pong in most other systems of romanising Korean (e.g. McCune–Reischauer, Yale, and North Korea's system), and are both used as Chinese surnames as well, pronounced Fèng in Mandarin.
 (meaning "to offer" or "to serve")
 (the name of a mythical bird)

Bong may also be a Belgian surname of unclear origin, a Swedish surname originating from the word  meaning "noise", and a Tibetan clan name.

Statistics
Statistics compiled by Patrick Hanks on the basis of the 2011 United Kingdom census and the Census of Ireland 2011 found 53 people with the surname Bong on the island of Great Britain and one on the island of Ireland. In the 1881 United Kingdom census there were five bearers of the surname. The 2010 United States census found 1,208 people with the surname Bong, making it the 21,599th-most-common surname in the country. This represented an increase from 1,051 people (22,783rd-most-common) in the 2000 census. In the 2010 census, roughly 44% of the bearers of the surname identified as Asian (up from 36% in the 2000 census), and 50% as non-Hispanic white (down from 58% in the 2000 census).

People

Chinese surnames
Bong Swan An (1931–2018), Chinese-born Indonesian entrepreneur
Bong Kee Chok (born 1937), leader of the North Kalimantan Communist Party
Diana Bong (born 1985), Malaysian wushu athlete and coach

Korean surnames
Deposed Crown Princess Bong, concubine of Crown Prince Yi Hyang of Joseon
Bong Chang-won (born 1938), South Korean wrestler
Bong Joon-ho (born 1969), South Korean film director and screenwriter
Bong Man-dae (born 1970), South Korean film director
Jung Bong (born 1980), South Korean baseball player
Bong Tae-gyu (born 1981), South Korean actor

Other
People with the surname Bong other than those listed in the sections above include:

Ngundeng Bong (–1890), Nuer prophet from southern Sudan
Richard Bong, German painter, plaintiff in US Supreme Court case Bong v. Campbell Art Co.
Harry Bong (1905–1987), Swedish Navy officer
Richard Bong (1920–1945), United States Army Air Forces major and Medal of Honor recipient in World War II
Melanie Bong (born 1968), German jazz singer
Ernest Bong (born 1984), ni-Vanuatu football goalkeeper
Josh Abercrombie (born 1984), American wrestler who used the ring name Billy Bong
Frédéric Bong (born 1987), Cameroonian football defender in France
Gaëtan Bong (born 1988), Cameroonian football defender in England
Tobias Bong (born 1988), German canoeist
Valentino Bong (born 1989), Malaysian squash player

Fictional characters
Doctor Bong, an American comic book character introduced in 1977
Bong Dal-hee, the title character of the 2007 South Korean television series Surgeon Bong Dal-hee

References

Swedish-language surnames
Chinese-language surnames
Korean-language surnames
Multiple Chinese surnames